Cable News Network Philippines (known as CNN Philippines and abbreviated as CNN PH) is a commercial broadcast, cable and satellite television network in the Philippines. It is owned and operated by Nine Media Corporation, together with Radio Philippines Network (RPN) as the main content provider, under license from Warner Bros. Discovery. Replacing 9TV, CNN Philippines was launched on March 16, 2015. CNN Philippines is the fifth local franchise of CNN in Asia, after CNN Indonesia, CNN Türk, CNN Arabic and CNN-IBN (now CNN-News18 in India).

CNN Philippines' local programming is produced from the Upper Ground Floor of the Worldwide Corporate Center, Shaw Boulevard corner Epifanio de los Santos Avenue in Mandaluyong. The channel maintains its analog transmitter located at the RPN Compound, #97 Panay Avenue, Brgy. South Triangle, Diliman, Quezon City; while digital transmission facilities are located at the Crestview Subdivision, Barangay San Roque, Antipolo, Rizal. On October 14, 2014, Turner Broadcasting System with Nine Media signed a five-year brand licensing agreement, until December 31, 2020 that will build the alliance between the two news agencies on television and online.

CNN PH was launched on March 16, 2015, 6:00 am (PST) and is seen on RPN's flagship station DZKB-TV, Channel 9 in Metro Manila and among eight regional VHF TV stations in Channels 9 Mandaue and Davao, Channel 12 Baguio, Channel 10 Iriga, Channel 8 Bacolod and Channel 5 Zamboanga. The flagship Filipino newscast News Night is also airing via RPN Radyo Ronda stations and on All TV. It operates daily via analog and digital from 5:00 am to 12:00 mn; while its programming broadcasts 24 hours daily on cable, satellite and live streaming providers.

Background
Under the brand licensing agreement between Turner Broadcasting System and Nine Media, the latter will pay CNN an undisclosed amount of monthly fee for programs and expertise from CNN International and CNN/U.S. that will air in the CNN Philippines in exchange of  locally produced news, current affairs and lifestyle programs and rolling news coverage from 9News, all based on the standards of CNN.  Also, 9News will be trained by CNN staff at the CNN Center in Atlanta, Georgia to enhance their reporting that will also help them to contribute reports for CNN International along with its news bureaus scattered worldwide; as consultants from the latter will help Nine Media/RPN for further development and expansion of CNN Philippines. The official news website, 9news.ph will be redesigned and changed into CNNPhilippines.com.

On the day of the soft launching of CNN Philippines held on October 14, 2014, at the Solaire Resort & Casino, CNN Worldwide President Jeff Zucker released a statement that said:

Presidential Communications Operations Office (PCOO) Sec. Sonny Coloma was the guest of honor at the trade launch of CNN PH at the Philippine International Convention Center the following day. RPN, the broadcaster of CNN PH, was under the portfolio of PCOO, also known as Media Ng Bayan, from 1986 (sequestration from the Benedicto family, the original owner of RPN) until 2011 (when Solar Entertainment Corporation privatized the station); although PCOO still owns 20% minority share on RPN.

History

Talk TV (2011–2012)

The channel was known as Talk TV from March 2, 2011, to October 29, 2012, on SBN Channel 21. Talk TV is formed by the Solar Television Network, by-then owned by Solar Entertainment Corporation after the latter led the privatization of state-sequestered Radio Philippines Network (RPN) in 2011. The first programs that aired on the channel were Dateline NBC, The Today Show, Today's Talk, NBC Nightly News, Inside Edition, Tonight Show with Jay Leno and Late Show with David Letterman.

Solar News, known for its back-to-basics and unbiased journalism, was formed in January 2012 during the coverage of the Impeachment Trial of former Chief Justice Renato Corona. Post-EDSA revolution ABS-CBN newsmen Pal Marquez, Jing Magsaysay and Pia Hontiveros together with former ANC anchors Claire Celdran, Mai Rodriguez and Nancy Irlanda were known as the pillars of Solar News. Reportorial team was composed by former reporters of RPN NewsWatch, the sole and longest-running English newscast of Radio Philippines Network, which was stopped airing in 2012 as an effect of RPN's privatization.

The hourly news bulletin Solar News Update (now Headlines) first aired in March 2012, followed by the primetime newscast Solar Network News and Solar Nightly News, which started airing on June 18 and July 16 of the same year, and Daybreak and Newsday on October 1, 2012. On October 30, 2012, at 05:30 am (UTC +8:00), Talk TV finally signed off to make way for the launching of the first 24-hour English news channel on both cable TV and free-to-air TV, Solar News Channel.

Solar News Channel (2012–2014)

Dubbed then as the "First 24/7 All-English News Channel on Free TV", Solar News Channel (SNC) replaces TalkTV. SNC was launched at 5:45am of October 30, 2012, on SBN Channel 21.

During the first months of the operations, the channel was producing major local newscasts including a native language newscast Solar News Cebuano, a sports newscast Solar Sports Desk and public affairs programs Legal HD, Medtalk, News.PH, Opposing Views, Elections 2013 and News Cafe. 60 Minutes, Top Gear, Undercover Boss and the "Stories" documentary block was also launched during SNC's time. SNC launched its own mobile application for smartphone users. Its consists of features such as live streaming, catch-up episodes (newscasts and Stories) and latest news from the network's website, solarnews.ph.

In November 2013, San Miguel Corp. President and COO Ramon S. Ang personally acquired the minority stake of STVNI. Brothers Wilson and William Tieng were the majority stockholders then of STVNI. On December 1, 2013, SNC moved to RPN Channel 9 for the improvements of the signal and to cater a wider audience, after RPN's former occupant and Solar Entertainment-owned ETC returned to SBN Channel 21 (ETC was aired in SBN-21 from 2008 to 2011 then at RPN-9 from 2011 to 2013). Solar News Channel then began to phase out its "Solar" branding on its newscast as it leaned away from the Tiengs. It also launched the Kapampangan national newscast Kapampangan News, along with the public service program Serbisyo All Access, which is shown in Filipino language. Solar News Channel was closed down before midnight of August 22, 2014.

9TV (2014–2015)

SNC was relaunched as 9TV on August 23, 2014. The Solar brand on Channel 9 was retired after the ALC Group of Companies thru Aliw Broadcasting Corporation bought out the 34% stake of the Tiengs' group with Solar Television Network and RPN 9. The Tiengs were losing money after they invested in RPN 9 and the group focused on the cable channels of Solar Entertainment Corporation. Solar News was then rebranded as 9News, with the programming and personnel retained. Kids Weekend, Home Shopping Network, TV Mass for the Homebound and local informative shows including Something to Chew On, Boys' Ride Out, Drive, Good Company, Two Stops Over and Bogart Case Files became part of 9TV's programming line-up.

Controversies also hounded 9TV as one of the motorpool drivers of the news division allegedly violated traffic rules after the news crewcab was entered a no-left/no-entry road (counterflow) while on hazard in the Balara area on September 14, 2014. 9News management then imposed a disciplinary actions and penalties against the driver and his designated reporter and cameraman.

Transition to CNN Philippines 
On October 14, 2014, Cabangon-Chua announced their partnership with the Turner Broadcasting System's Cable News Network (CNN).

As a part of transition to CNN Philippines, 9TV temporarily used green screen as its news studio in December 2014, along with the renovations of the newsroom and the strategic hiring of the personnel, and its newscasts began adopting the CNN graphic package more than a week later (January 15, 2015), in time for 9TV's coverage of Pope Francis's visit to the country. Home Shopping Network (now Shop TV) and Kids Weekend block are also axed on the said month. Foreign non-CNN produced programs (NBC and CBS programs) were also dropped in February, including NBC Nightly News (which was, in any way, unrelated to the suspension, and the eventual axing of its news anchor Brian Williams on February 10, 2015, a few weeks before being pulled out of the 9TV programming, due to controversies regarding to the Iraq War helicopter incident).

Launch and first eight months

CNN Philippines, along with its tagline "We Tell The Story Of The Filipino" was launched after a few weeks of preparation on March 16, 2015. It's programmings from 9TV is remained and it added CNN programs to add the program line-up. In its initial broadcast, picture format remained in full 4:3 standard definition while testing the 14:9 broadcast format overnight. Since Holy Week of 2015, CNN Philippines started full-time broadcasts on 16:9 widescreen format, aligning with several CNN worldwide channels. However, the output is shown as a 14:9 letterboxed widescreen (both on free-to-air and cable/satellite). It is the first Philippine free-to-air and TV channel to use the 14:9 aspect ratio to match the latter format, a distinction that lasted until March 2017.

Magsaysay out, Jarin-Bennett in
In September 2015, Nine Media Corporation President Reggie Galura and CNN Philippines SVP for News and Current Affairs Jing Magsaysay left the network, following the "right-sizing" retrenchment of 70 junior staffers and contractual employees, who worked in the company for Programming and Technical Engineering divisions. Also, Magsaysay left his sole noontime newscast, CNN Philippines Newsroom, leaving Mai Rodriguez the solo anchor of Newsroom.

Effective November 2, 2015, CNN International's Armie Jarin-Bennett took over as Managing Editor of CNN Philippines, replacing Magsaysay. Bennett had been the head of CNN Content Sales and Partnerships in Asia Pacific after 17 years of working as writer and producer on various programs for CNN and CNN International. Her production expertise gave her an 2012 Emmy Award for the coverage of the Egyptian Revolution of 2011 and a nomination for Typhoon Yolanda (Haiyan) coverage in 2013. Born and raised in Manila, Jarin-Bennett began her career as radio newscaster before moving as an intern in the CNN Center in 1996.

Expansion of news operation and first anniversary
On February 15, 2016, CNN Philippines updated its station bumpers, remove the station's voice over, improved intros for their newscasts, similar to some CNN International programs like CNN Newsroom, CNN Today, International Desk, CNN Money and CNN Money View, with bluer hue, with exceptions to their lifestyle programming, while newer bumpers for general segments and current affairs shows followed suit. The channel also changed their theme music for their newscasts and bumpers and added new programs, led by the Philippine edition of New Day.   Nightly News was axed in favor of an expanded Newsroom, making CNN Philippines Network News the sole lineal brand holdover from its Solar tenure. Personalities from other networks such as Pinky Webb joined CNN Philippines, where she is the main anchor of Balitaan, its first ever newscast in Filipino, which was first used in Serbisyo All Access and in the Post Debate Analysis of PiliPinas Debates 2016.

Since February 2016, CNN PH also started to phase out current affairs shows that debuted under Solar News Channel (Legal Help Desk), former CNN shows (Eco-Solutions) and HLN produced shows (Nancy Grace and Dr. Drew On Call) that were aired as filler programming in favor of newer staple programming such as Smerconish and more room for news programming.

Emphasis on local and global programming
In August 2016, CNN Sans (the corporate font of their mother network) heavily replaced Helvetica that was used during their transition and first year of operation (which used as substitute to Gotham) as the on-air graphics of their newscasts and current affairs shows, following suit on the implementation of the new font in all CNN operated and franchised networks worldwide. The font was later used on their promos, infomercials, and revamped bumpers in February 2016, and also on their PiliPinas Debates 2016 (Vice Presidential leg) and Traffic Center (which shared with the same graphic package).

HLN-produced programs such as Morning Express, Weekend Express and The Daily Share (which ended on HLN's programming on mid-November 2016) were axed from the local lineup during the main network's coverage of the respective Republican and Democratic National Conventions but returned on August 23 due to putting the premiere of CNN International programming (Amanpour and Anderson Cooper 360°) on hold. Amanpour (whose select stories were featured on CNN PH's Global Conversations) was eventually given the go-signal, but is only shown on special occasions when the show discusses Philippine affairs in global context. Its first stand-alone broadcast on CNN Philippines was on August 31, 2016, with Christiane Amanpour interviewing Senators Alan Peter Cayetano and Leila de Lima.

CNN/U.S. programming (The Lead, Smerconish and Reliable Sources) that aired during their first year of operation were aired in limitation on the same month, Erin Burnett OutFront remained on the local lineup until September 22, 2016.

Since mid-September 2016, HLN programming was relegated to the cable-only overnight graveyard slot to make way to the expansion of current affairs blocks. The Service Road with James Deakin debuted on September 19 while The Source with Pinky Webb followed suit a week later. Two CBS-produced shows (60 Minutes and Undercover Boss: Canada) were axed the same month.

Effective October 9, 2016, Armie Jarin-Bennett was appointed as president of Nine Media Corporation. With her promotion to presidency, more CNN International shows began airing as weekend staples, notably The Art of Movement and Vital Signs with Dr. Sanjay Gupta, that premiered during the latter week of October. Vital Signs is currently a companion show to CNN Philippines' MedTalk.

Second year, sweeping restructuring
Sweeping restructuring started out by February, starting off with the further replacement of shows originating from the network's predecessors. Newsroom was further expanded to include a mid-morning Filipino newscast with Ruth Cabal, a former news anchor and reporter from GMA Network, replacing Serbisyo All Access since February 6 and a weekend edition since March 4. Additional political shows also premiered such as Political Insider with Gilbert Remulla (which was later axed in July 2017, after the sought controversy of said host, due to his strong opinion stance leaning towards President Rodrigo Duterte on engaging word wars against with the Liberal Party supporters on Twitter). CNN Philippines Network News would be retired and replaced with News Night with Pia Hontiveros effective March 27, and weekend slots would be filled by Sports Desk Weekend effective March 11. Upon cancellation of Cebuano News and Kapampangan News by the end of March 2018, the second hour of CNN Newsroom (simulcast from CNN International) replaced the vacant slot. It also introduced the new slogan "At The Heart Of The Story", that showcases network's capability to report instantly and tell the story. But it is only applicable for promo plugs only.

In April 2017, the network reconfigured to a 16:9 anamorphic widescreen standard-definition format, eliminating the use of letterbox.

Weekend programming expansion, extension of partnership and COVID-19 pandemic
On September 1, 2018, CNN Philippines launched its weekend morning block, consisting of animated shows from sister channel Cartoon Network, infotainment show KidDo, and a 15-minute "junior edition" of its news program Newsroom hosted by teenagers. The now called CNN Philippines Junior block is similar to the Kids Weekend block from its predecessor 9TV. This also marks the return of the Cartoon Network block on RPN since it was discontinued in 2010 since C/S 9 or Solar TV affiliation.

On November 13, 2019, CNN Philippines announced its intention to air weekend broadcasts of selected NBA games in interim basis (as a blocktimer) following the expiration of broadcast rights of Solar Entertainment and ABS-CBN Sports which led to the closure of NBA Premium TV and BTV (CNN PH's free TV partner, RPN 9, previously aired the games also under C/S 9 or Solar TV affiliation).  This is due to the pending evaluation of the joint bid of ABS-CBN Sports and Cignal TV/ESPN5 for the aforementioned broadcast rights.

Based from a December 2019 report of Media Newser Philippines, Nine Media Corporation and WarnerMedia agreed to extend its 2014 brand licensing agreement until the end of 2026. The extension of partnership is brought about by the positive performance and financial stability of CNN Philippines as well as to improve its ratings of the network in 2019.

On March 18, 2020, CNN Philippines was forced to go off-air until March 22, after an employee working at the Worldwide Corporate Center, where the network's headquarters is situated, was confirmed to be positive with COVID-19. The channel, however, resumed broadcasts operations on March 23, 2020. The network went off-air again on July 7, 2020, after a utility staff tested positive for COVID-19. It resumed broadcasting on July 11, 2020.

On January 10, 2022, CNN Philippines was forced to go off-air again for the third time, due to limited staffs and implementation of health protocols in the broadcast center. Broadcast resumed on January 11, 2022 at 12 noon.

Awards and citations
In April 2016, CNN Philippines bagged 6 awards from the Golden Dove Awards of the Kapisanan ng mga Brodkaster ng Pilipinas, most notably, the Best Newscaster Award for Newsroom anchor Mitzi Borromeo. On June 30, 2016, CNN Philippines was recognized as the "Television Station of the Year" in the Rotary Club of Manila Journalism Awards.

During the 6th EdukCircle Awards, Pia Hontiveros and Pinky Webb were given a special citation for their work on the lone vice presidential leg of the PiliPinas Debates 2016.

Two of CNN Philippines' news programs have been recognized by the Asian Academy Creative Awards for national categories on October 15, 2020.

"The Source with Pinky Webb" won as "Best Current Affairs Programme or Series" while "The Final Word with Rico Hizon" won as "Best News Programme" in the country.

Digital television
On January 28, 2016, CNN Philippines through Radio Philippines Network is conducting a DTT testing using ISDB-T on UHF Channel 19 (503.143 MHz). One year later in 2017, Nine Media Corporation together with RPN acquired its UHF transmitter complex in Crestview Heights Subdivision, Brgy. San Roque, Antipolo, Rizal from Progressive Broadcasting Corporation to use RPN's Digital terrestrial television broadcast in Metro Manila and nearby provinces in preparation of digital television in the Philippines, which is expected to be fully implemented in 2023.

Programming

CNN PH broadcasts local news and international reports from the CNN/U.S. and CNNI reporters pool. Current affairs and lifestyle programs are also aired and produced by different local production outfits. As a part of the deal between CNN and Nine Media Corporation, select programs from CNN/U.S. and HLN also air, mainly in the overnight hours.

Simulcasts between CNN PH, CNNI and CNN/U.S.
When warranted, breaking stories and special scheduled events are also broadcast on CNN PH via the US or international feed. Notable of these were during the Paris and Brussels terrorist attacks, New Year's Eve, select US presidential speeches and US presidential election coverage.

Hosts and news anchors

Current

Pia Hontiveros (CNN Philippines Anchor & Chief Correspondent)
Pinky Webb (CNN Philippines Senior Anchor & Correspondent)
Rico Hizon (CNN Philippines Senior Anchor & Director of News Content Development)
 Ruth Cabal (CNN Philippines Anchor & Senior Correspondent)
Mai Rodriguez
Ria Tanjuatco-Trillo
 Andrei Felix 
 Menchu Macapagal 
 Christine Jacob-Sandejas
 Dr. Freddie Gomez (CNN Philippines Resident Doctor)
 Paolo Abrera
 Nicole Curato 
 Melissa Lopez

Former

 Jing Magsaysay (former CNN Philippines' Senior Vice President for News)
 Mitzi Borromeo  
 Cherie Mercado
 Amelyn Veloso (deceased) 
Claire Celdran
 Malou Tiquia
 Roanna Jamir
 Atty. Karen Jimeno
 Ina Andolong-Chavenia
 Hilary Isaac
 Jun Tariman
 Mico Halili
 Charles Tiu 
 Gilbert Remulla
 Nicolette Henson-Hizon  (now with CLTV36)
 Cesca Litton-Kalaw
 Gani Oro
 Anthony Pangilinan (now with One News)
 Angel Jacob
 Mike Alimurung (former CNN Philippines Business Analyst)
 James Deakin
 Claudine Trillo
 Rachel Alejandro
 Giselle Sanchez
 Shamcey Supsup
 Chesca Buencamino
 Bambi Del Rosario
 Gabby Sandejas (Newsroom Junior Edition Anchor)
 Nate Lopez (Newsroom Junior Edition Anchor)
 Dana Villano (Newsroom Junior Edition Anchor)
 Janella Renner (Newsroom Junior Edition Anchor)
 Isaac Dantes (Newsroom Junior Edition Anchor)
 Emman Rivera (Newsroom Junior Edition Anchor)

Correspondents
David Santos 
Anjo Alimario 
Lois Calderon 
Xianne Arcangel 
Rex Remitio
Triciah Terada
Paolo Barcelon
Carolyn Bonquin
Gerg Cahiles
Crissy Dimatulac
Paige Javier
AC Nicholls 
Tristan Nodalo
Eimor Santos
Pauline Verzosa
Sam Sadhwani

Regional Correspondents

 Dale Israel (Cebu)
 Rose Olarte (Legazpi City)
 Carla Doromal (Aklan)
 Leah Agonoy (Pagadian)
 Dennis Arcon (Cotabato City)
 Ron Lozano (Southern Luzon)
 Jean Caparoso (Kidapawan)
 Wilmark Amazona (Tacloban)
 Pearl Gajunera (Davao City)
 Roy Bustillo (Dumaguete)
 Melchor Velez (Bukidnon)
 Alwen Saliring (Cagayan de Oro)
 Lauren Anuma (Baguio/Cordilleras)
 Roland Ortillano (South Cotabato)

Affiliate

References

External links
Media Ownership Monitor Philippines - Television by VERA Files and Reporters Without Borders

 
Radio Philippines Network
Television networks in the Philippines
Television channels and stations established in 2015
Warner Bros. Discovery networks
24-hour television news channels in the Philippines
English-language television stations in the Philippines
2015 establishments in the Philippines
Publicly funded broadcasters
Philippine news websites